Megelli Motorcycles was a British motorcycle manufacturer, which made its debut at the Milan EICMA exhibition in November 2007. Megelli motorcycles was founded by the Managing Director of Sports and Leisure Direct UK Ltd, Barry Hall, who previously specialised in off-road Aeon all-terrain vehicles, mini bikes and pit bikes. The Megelli range is currently sold in 37 countries in Europe, Asia, Australia, Africa, North America and South America.

Megelli's manufacturing agreement with Huansong Industries (group) Co Limited Hsun ended on 31 December 2013.

Development
Barry Hall's access to specialist 'virtual' motorcycle design centres and established UK vehicle production and engineering facilities enabled the company to progress from the initial vision to production of motorcycles in three years. The original design sketches for the launch models were produced in July 2005 and test production began in September 2007. By December 2007 the range was on sale worldwide.
Megelli Motorcycles are designed and engineered in the UK using custom tooling for the majority of components, with final assembly in China. Approximately 75% of the components are from Taiwanese companies. This includes the engines with high specification ceramic coated cylinders from SYM, and KOSO instruments panel. The main frame, swingarm, sub frame and engine cradle, and all forged components are also from Taiwanese companies.

Model range

125 cc
There were three 125 cc bikes in the Megelli motorcycle range, all featuring the same 125 cc, four-stroke engine, under seat exhaust and frame. Available models are 125R, 125M and 125S.

The 125M Motard was a supermoto-styled road bike.

Then there was the racing-styled 125R, full faired with a split twin headlamp assembly. Seat height: . Wheelbase: .

Finally, the Naked 125S version was almost identical to the 125R, albeit with significantly less aero parts and a single front headlight assembly. Seat height: . Wheelbase: .

250 cc
Megelli has finished working on a 250 cc engine for the American, Asia and Australian markets. Keeping the single-cylinder four-stroke design, horsepower was increased from 11 hp to around 26 hp. Like the 125 cc bikes, the 250 is available in the same three configurations: 250M, 250R and 250S.

Specification
All three 250 cc models share the same four-stroke single cylinder engine with a compression of 10:1, DENI carburettor and CDI ignition. Drive is via a six-speed gearbox and it has electric start and disc brakes. The bike features a 4-valve OHC 26 HP single cylinder engine, an aluminium multi twin spar trellis frame and T6 aluminium trellis swing-arm. The suspension consists of a telescopic front fork with aluminium dropouts and a mono pre-load adjustable rear suspension.

References

External links

 Official Megelli Web site
 Megelli Video

Defunct motorcycle manufacturers of the United Kingdom